Defense Attorney is an American old-time radio crime drama. It was broadcast on ABC from July 6, 1951, to December 30, 1952. It was also known as The Defense Rests.

Characters
The title character was Martha Ellis "Marty" Barrett, "a respected attorney who has a reputation for integrity" and "who champions causes of the underdog and unjustly accused". Jud Barnes, a newspaper reporter, was Barrett's boyfriend. Ron Lackmann wrote in his book Mercedes McCambridge: A Biography and Career Record that Barrett "spent more time solving crimes with her boyfriend ... than she did in the courtroom".

Personnel
Mercedes McCambridge had the title role, and Howard Culver played Judson Barnes. Tony Barrett portrayed Detective Lieutenant Ed Ledis. Supporting actors in the program included Paul Fries, Bill Johnston, Kay Wiley, Harry Bartell, Dallas McKennon, Irene Tedrow, and Parley Baer. Orville Anderson was the announcer.

Warren Lewis was the producer, and Dwight Hauser was the director. Cameron Blake (the program's creator), Bill Johnston, and Joel Murcott were writers. Music was by Rex Khoury and Basil Adlam.

Background
Defense Attorney originated with an audition record, The Defense Rests, which was made for a proposed NBC series in April 1951.

TV pilot
In 1953, the trade publication Billboard reported on work on a television version of Defense Attorney. An article in the magazine's March 28, 1953, issue said that Don Sharpe was in New York "to begin sales efforts on his newest film show, Defense Attorney, starring Mercedes McCambridge, and based on his former radio series of the same name." Fletcher Markle wrote and directed the pilot episode, which was filmed by Desilu Productions.

Recognition
McCambridge's work on Defense Attorney led to her receiving honorary membership in the Los Angeles Women's Bar Association and the Favorite Dramatic Actress Award from Radio-TV Mirror magazine.

Notes

References

External links

Logs
Log of episodes of Defense Attorney from The Digital Deli Too
Log of episodes of Defense Attorney from Jerry Haendiges Vintage Radio Logs
Log of episodes of Defense Attorney from Old Time Radio Researchers Group
Log of episodes of Defense Attorney from radioGOLDINdex

Streaming
Streaming episodes of Defense Attorney from the Internet Archive
Streaming episodes of Defense Attorney from Old Time Radio Researchers Group Library

1951 radio programme debuts
1952 radio programme endings
1950s American radio programs
ABC radio programs
American radio dramas